Apolinary Horawski, also seen as Gorawski (Belarusian: Апалінарый Гіляравіч Гараўскі, Russian: Аполлинарий Гиляриевич Горавский; 23 January 1833 – 28 March 1900) was a Belarusian-born Polish painter active mainly in St. Petersburg.

Biography 
Apalinar (Apollinary) was born into an impoverished family of the Belarusian landed gentry. His parents were Guilyar Frantsevich and Maryanna Yakauleuna Garausky. The family used the coat of arms "Korab" (since the 17th century) and traced its bloodline to the Belarusian nobleman Grakala-Garausky (in the 19th century the first part of the surname Grakala fell into disuse). The artist's father Guilyar Garausky inherited the land (about 200 ha) from his father and grandfather. In the family, there were three daughters and the sons Ipalit (1828 ― after 1864), Apalinar (Apollinary) (1833―1900), Karl (1838 ― after 1869), Hektar (1843―1893), Guilyar (1847 ― after 1875). Karl and Hektar were professional servicemen, Ipalit, Apalinar and Guilyar ― artists.

Apollinary, at ten, was sent to serve in the Brest-Litovsk Cadet Corps. Cadets studied general subjects of the classical school curriculum, such as languages, natural and social sciences. They were taught military disciplines, marching drill, riding, shooting, fencing, gymnastics, swimming, and also music and dance, drawing and painting. Apollinary had no inclination for military affairs, but liked drawing and painting. 

The architect Nicholas Benois, who was visiting Goravsky's uncle (Chief of the Cadet Corps), took notice of Apollinary's works and later helped him enroll at the Imperial Academy of Arts, where he studied with Maxim Vorobiev and Fyodor Bruni. He graduated in 1854 with a gold medal. From 1855 to 1860 he travelled and painted throughout Europe, visiting Geneva, Paris and Rome and stopping in Düsseldorf to study with Andreas Achenbach. During this trip, he met Pavel Tretyakov and began a collaboration that would later be very beneficial to his career. On his return to Saint Petersburg, he was awarded the title of "Academician".

In 1869, the Academy gave him a stipend of 300 rubles annually to "complete his education" and produce paintings of folk-life in Belarus and Ukraine, a commission which he pursued diligently, despite the cold weather and rheumatism in his right leg. For twenty years (1865—1885), he occasionally taught drawing at the "Society for the Encouragement of the Arts", although he spent most of his time in Belarus at his estate near Kirilovich.

Apollinary Goravsky died suddenly on March 28, 1900, at the Mariinsky Hospital in St. Petersburg at the age of 67. The death was reported in Novoye Vremya (New Times) and Istorichesky Vestnik (Historical Herald) magazines. The artist was buried at Vyborg cemetery.

His widow, Alexandra, remained without maintenance with daughters, Marya and Yulia, and started selling the artist's works in the 1900s. The greater part of his works are exhibited in the Belarusian National Arts Museum. In 2009, Belarus issued a stamp featuring his painting "Evening in Minsk".

Works in the Belarusian National Arts Museum 

The view of the Narva Gates from Ekateringof Park (1851)
Landscape with a river and a road (1853)
Praying old woman (1872)
The view of the Arve river in the vicinity of Chamonix (1859)
Praying Jew (1857?)
Portrait of the mother (1868)
The bathers (1858)
Evening (1854)
Landscape with a river (1859)
Oaks (1858)
Rural landscape (1855)
The repentant Mary Magdalene (1861)
Portrait of an unknown in a black dress (1868)
Portrait of S.M. Tretyakova (1857)
A weedy pond
Near a forge (1862)
Landscape with a river (1853)
The view of an oak grove on the banks of the Svislach river near Babruisk (1855)
By the piano (1868)
By the easel (1868)
An evening in Minsk province (1870s)
Portrait of a young woman in a white dress (1863)
Portrait of an unknown with a palette (1867)
Portrait of artist L.F. Lagorio (1890s)
Clover in gloom and forest expanses (1895)
Landscape (1897)

Selected paintings

Literature 
 Апалінар Гараўскі = Аполлинарий Горавский = Apalinar Garausky. Минск : Беларусь, 2014. ― .
 Гiсторыя беларускага мастацтва (History of Belarusian Art) 6 vols. Мінск : 1989.

References

Further reading 
 L. M. Drobau, Беларускiя мастакi XIX стагоддзя (Belarusian Artists of the Nineteenth Century), Minsk, 1971

External links 

1833 births
1900 deaths
Belarusian painters
Belarusian art
Landscape painters
Imperial Academy of Arts alumni
Awarded with a large gold medal of the Academy of Arts
Members of the Imperial Academy of Arts
19th-century Polish painters
Polish male painters